N.S.S College, Ottapalam is an institute of higher education in Ottapalam, India. The college was founded in 1961. It was funded by donations and was consecrated by Swami Vishadanandha,  President of Sree Ramakrishna Ashram, Palappuram, and was formally inaugurated by Mrs. Prabhakaran Thampan on 10 July 1961. In July 1962, it was upgraded and was shifted to the present site. The premises of the College consist mostly of land donated by Smt. K.P.S. Menon and Sri. Vapala Sankaranarayana Menon. The college hosts a national seminar on economics, hosted by president-in-charge, Venkatesh Athreya. It is affiliated with the University of Calicut. The current principal is Dr. Rajesh. R. It is 
accredited with A Grade status by the National Assessment and Accreditation Council.

Notable alumni

 Mundur Krishnankutty, author
 P. Sreeramakrishnan, Former speaker, Kerala Legislative Assembly
 M. B. Rajesh, Speaker of Kerala Legislative Assembly, Former Member of Parliament
 V. K. Sreekandan, Member of Parliament, Palakkad
 M. Hamsa, Member of Legislative Assembly, Ottapalam
 S. Ajaya Kumar, Former Member of Parliament
 Anita Nair, author
 Lal Jose, film director
 Stephen Devassy, musician

Courses offered

See also

References

External links
Official website
University of Calicut
University Grants Commission
National Assessment and Accreditation Council

Colleges in Kerala
Universities and colleges in Palakkad district
Colleges affiliated with the University of Calicut
Educational institutions established in 1961
1961 establishments in Kerala